Princess Nabhabhorn Prabha, the Princess Dibayaratana Kiritkulini, 13 May 1864 - 19 July 1958, was a Princess of Siam (later Thailand). She was a member of Siamese royal family as a daughter of King Mongkut and Chao Khun Chom Manda Samli.

Her mother was Samli Bunnag (is a daughter of Tat Bunnag and Klai Bunnag), She was given full name as Phra Chao Borom Wong Ther Phra Ong Chao Nabhabhorn Prabha Krom Luang Dibayaratana Kiritkulini.

Princess Nabhabhorn Prabha died on 19 July 1958 at the age 94.

References 

1864 births
1958 deaths
19th-century Thai women
19th-century Chakri dynasty
20th-century Thai women
20th-century Chakri dynasty
Thai female Phra Ong Chao
Children of Mongkut
Daughters of kings